Yonghu station is a station of Line 3, Shenzhen Metro. It is located at the crossroads of Shenhui Road and Dakang Road, and opened on 28 December 2010.

Station layout

Exits

References

External links
 Shenzhen Metro Yonghu Station (Chinese)
 Shenzhen Metro Yonghu Station (English)

Railway stations in Guangdong
Shenzhen Metro stations
Longgang District, Shenzhen
Railway stations in China opened in 2010